Óscar Peñas García (born 17 November 1974 in Madrid) is a male judoka from Spain, who competed in three consecutive Summer Olympics: 2000, 2004, and 2008.

Achievements

Notes

References

External links
 
 
 

1974 births
Living people
Spanish male judoka
Judoka at the 2000 Summer Olympics
Judoka at the 2004 Summer Olympics
Judoka at the 2008 Summer Olympics
Olympic judoka of Spain
Sportspeople from Madrid
Mediterranean Games bronze medalists for Spain
Mediterranean Games medalists in judo
Competitors at the 1997 Mediterranean Games